John Phillips (June 16, 1810 – November 7, 1878) was an English-born political figure in New Brunswick, Canada. He represented Restigouche County in the Legislative Assembly of New Brunswick from 1870 to 1878 as a Liberal member.

He was born in Westmorland and educated in England. He immigrated to New Brunswick in 1831. The following year, he married Catherine McCarthy. He ran unsuccessfully for a seat in the provincial assembly in 1861 and again for the House of Commons in 1867. He was elected to the provincial assembly in an 1870 by-election held after Alexander C. DesBrisay resigned his seat. Phillips also served as deputy sheriff for Gloucester County. His daughter Elizabeth married Joseph Cunard Barberie.

References 
The Canadian parliamentary companion and annual register, 1877, CH Mackintosh

1810 births
Year of death missing
New Brunswick Liberal Association MLAs